Cyril Baille (born 15 September 1993) is a French rugby union player, who plays for French Top 14 side Toulouse and the France national team.

International career
Baille made his debut for France in November 2016 and was part of the squad for the 2017 Six Nations Championship.

International tries

Honours

International 
 France
Six Nations Championship: 2022
Grand Slam: 2022

Club 
 Toulouse
Top 14: 2018–19, 2020–21
European Rugby Champions Cup: 2020–2021

References

External links
France profile at FFR
L'Équipe profile
ESPN Profile
Stade Toulousain profile

1993 births
Living people
Sportspeople from Pau, Pyrénées-Atlantiques
French rugby union players
France international rugby union players
Stade Toulousain players
Rugby union props